Avgury is the name of several rural localities in Russia.

Modern localities
Avgury (rural locality), a village in Novofedorovsky Selsoviet of Staroshaygovsky District in the Republic of Mordovia;

Alternative names
Avgury, alternative name of Mordovskaya Avgura, a village in Chekashevo-Polyansky Selsoviet of Kovylkinsky District in the Republic of Mordovia;